South East Water is one of three Victorian Government owned retail water corporations that provides drinking water, sewerage, trade waste, recycled water and water-saving services for residents and businesses in an area ranging from the south-east of Melbourne to south Gippsland in Australia. The water distributed by South East Water is supplied by Melbourne Water, as is the infrastructure. Oversight is provided by the Department of Environment, Land, Water and Planning.

South East Water services the south eastern region of Melbourne, including the Mornington Peninsula.

In September 2015, South East Water moved its head office to a new building on the Frankston foreshore.

Infrastructure
South East Water manages over:
 14,041 kilometers of water mains
 1,068+ kilometres of recycled water main
 Eight water recycling plants
 One stormwater treatment plant 
 10,995+ kilometres of sewer mains
 273 sewage pump stations
 Nine recycled water pump stations
 82 water pump stations
 270 kilometres of coastline

As well as supplying recycled water produced from its own plants, South East Water is a major supplier of recycled water from the Eastern Treatment Plant.

South East Water manages the following recycled water schemes:
 South East outfall customers
 Domestic dual pipe schemes in the Cranbourne area.

iota Services 
South East Water has established a commercial division called iota Services, which is tasked with commercialising and marketing innovations, products and services from across the business. Current services cover a variety of applications for operations, maintenance, capital delivery and safety in the utility sector.

References

Sewerage infrastructure in Victoria (Australia)
Water companies of Victoria (Australia)
Water treatment facilities
Water infrastructure in Australia
Companies based in Melbourne
Frankston, Victoria